"My Life" is the third single from the American singer Hot Rod of his career. The song is from his upcoming non-titled first extended play. The song was released on May 24, 2012 for digital download on iTunes.

Background
The song was officially released in the American reality television series The Pauly D Project on MTV in the same day of iTunes release. It's his fourth single under 50 Cent's label G-Note / G-Unit Records since he was signed on 2006

Track listing
Digital Single

References

External links
iTunes

2012 singles
Hot Rod (rapper) songs
2012 songs
G-Unit Records singles